Monika Mauch (Geislingen an der Steige, Baden-Württemberg) is a German soprano.

Mauch specializes in early music, studied singing with Richard Wistreich at the Institute for Early Music of Trossingen conservatory where she obtained her diploma. She also studied with Jill Feldman in Paris and has been described as having a boyish agile voice.

Selected discography
 Dowland A Musical Banquet with lutenist Nigel North. ECM.
 Couperin, and others. Les Escapades du Roy – French baroque songs. Christophorus
 Handel. Neun deutsche Arien (Nine German Arias). With L'arpa festante/Rien Voskuilen. Carus

References

External links
 
 

Living people
Year of birth missing (living people)
German sopranos